Lycia Danielle Trouton is a Canadian artist.

Early life
Lycia Danielle Trouton was born in Belfast, Northern Ireland, and raised in Vancouver, Canada. Trouton went to pre-college at Emily Carr University of Art and Design and Otis College of Art and Design. She studied at Carnegie Mellon and with tapestry weaver Dr Diana Wood Conroy.

Education
Trouton obtained her BFA in sculpture at Carnegie Mellon University, Pennsylvania, U.S.A in 1988 and then her MFA, at Cranbrook Educational Community School of Art, Bloomfield Hills, Michigan, U.S.A in 1991. She moved to Australia in 2001 and completed her doctorate in 2005 at the age of 38 at the University of Wollongong, 2001–5.  She teaches, exhibits and curates around the world and currently resides in B.C., Canada or Belfast.

Career
After beginning her career as an Earth or Land artist, she became a Public Artist with commissions in Seattle, Washington. Trouton has held visiting lectureships or done presentations at several higher education institutions, including Malmo Art School of Lund University, FLACSO Ecuador, University of Tasmania and Sheridan College, Toronto.

Tapestry

In 1999, after a visit to Northern Ireland, Trouton received a grant from Canada Council of the Arts to work on textile memorial to those killed in The Troubles of Northern Ireland called the Linen Memorial. It is a list of almost 4,000 of those who died in 'The Troubles' in Northern Ireland from 1966 to 2009 in a chronological Names List, embroidered on Irish Linen handkerchiefs. The Memorial was publicly unveiled in Ireland at a peace and reconciliation centre on the first Private Day of Reflection, 2007, on the sectarian violence. It formed the basis of Trouton's graduate thesis. It was also shown in Canberra's Design Centre, CraftACT, Australia, 2004, and in 2011 in Portneuf, Quebec, Canada as a part of Quebec's International Biennale of Flax and Linen (BILP).

Writing by or about the artist 
Lace: contemporary textiles : exhibition + new works
FibreArts 2007, VOL 34; NUMB 3, pages 44–45
The Linen Memorial: State and Sectarian Violence in Northern Ireland, in Pain and Death: Politics, Aesthetics, Legalities, a Journal of Research School of Humanities, ed. Carolyn Strange. Vol. XIV, No. 2, 2007. ANU Press and e-Press, Canberra, ACT, Australia.
TIMEFRAMES 52 page color catalogue essays by Donald Kuspit, Beverly Leviner, Robert Metzger, Christopher Youngs works by Stan Douglas, Peter Fischli and David Weiss, Hamish Fulton, Rebecca Horn, Mark Klett, Eadweard Muybridge, Michael Snow, Hiroshi Sugimoto, Susan Crowder, Lycia Trouton February 14 – April 11, 1997 FG97-A1249-20

References

 General

External links
Lycia Trouton's website

Living people
20th-century Canadian women artists
21st-century Canadian women artists
Canadian contemporary artists
Canadian installation artists
Irish contemporary artists
Academic staff of the British Columbia Institute of Technology
Carnegie Mellon University College of Fine Arts alumni
Cranbrook Academy of Art alumni
Whittier College alumni
Artists from Belfast
Year of birth missing (living people)